Piotr Burlikowski (born 14 September 1970) is a Polish former footballer who played as a forward. He played in the top divisions of Poland and Finland, as well as playing abroad in Germany, France and the United States.

Career

Early years

Born in Bydgoszcz, Burlikowski started playing football for his local club Chemik Bydgoszcz, breaking into the first team in 1987. He spent three seasons with Chemik before making a move to join city rivals Polonia Bydgoszcz. After only a six-month spell with Polonia he returned to Chemik, who at this time were playing in the II liga, with Burlikowski being a part of the team that made its highest ever finish in the Polish leagues, 5th in the II liga. During his second spell with Chemik, Burlikowski made a total of 39 appearances and scored 11 goals in the league. In 1993 Chemik suffered relegation from the II liga, leading to Burlikowski leaving the club.

Top division football and short term moves

In 1993 Burlikowski joined Olimpia Poznań, who had been recently relegated from the I liga. During the 1993–94 season Olimpia performed well in the league finishing runners-up and securing an immediate return to Poland's top division. During this season Burlikowski played 24 times and scored 4 times in the league. Burlikowski made his I liga debut on 30 July 1994 in the 6–2 win against Raków Częstochowa. In total, he made 34 appearances and scored 12 goals as Olimpia secured their safety in the league. At the end of the season Olimpia were involved in a merger with Lechia Gdańsk, creating the Olimpia-Lechia Gdańsk team. Burlikowski originally stayed with the Olimpia-Lechia merger, but soon left the club to join fellow I liga side Sokół Pniewy/Tychy after playing in only 4 games. His time with Sokół was equally short, and after only a few months he had moved to Germany to play for the lower league team VfL Herzlake, returning to Poland after 6 months, joining I liga side Polonia Warszawa. After a series of short term moves, Burlikowski settled down for 18 months, returning to the city of his birth and playing for Zawisza Bydgoszcz. During these 18 months he made 48 appearances and scored 16 goals in the league. For the 1998–99 season Burlikowski joined Pogoń Szczecin, in what would be his final season playing in Poland's top division, making 20 appearances over the course of the season.

Later playing years

After his season with Pogoń, he joined French side FC Aurillac for a season, before a series of more short-term deals with clubs. Initially returning to Zawisza Bydgoszcz before playing in Finland with Rovaniemen Palloseura, and in the United States with New Jersey Falcons. He returned to Poland in 2001, spending a season with Arka Gdynia, before spending seasons with Polonia Bydgoszcz and Zawisza Bydgoszcz, retiring from playing in 2004.

After playing

After playing he became the sports director at Korona Kielce from 2005 until 2006, having a similar role as director of sports affairs with Arka Gdynia. In 2009 Burlikowski became the vice-president of Zawisza Bydgoszcz, holding this role until 2011 after changes on the management board. Burlikowski again held roles of sports director, firstly with Cracovia from 2013 to 2014, and with Zagłębie Lubin from 2014 to 2016. In 2016 he became an advisor to Zbigniew Boniek, President of the Polish Football Association.

References

1970 births
Living people
Polish footballers
Olimpia Poznań players
Lechia Gdańsk players
GKS Tychy players
VfL Herzlake players
Polonia Warsaw players
Zawisza Bydgoszcz players
Pogoń Szczecin players
Rovaniemen Palloseura players
Arka Gdynia players
Association football forwards
Polish expatriate footballers
Expatriate footballers in Finland
Polish expatriate sportspeople in Finland
Expatriate footballers in Germany
Polish expatriate sportspeople in Germany
Expatriate footballers in France
Polish expatriate sportspeople in France
Expatriate soccer players in the United States
Polish expatriate sportspeople in the United States